Joseph Ruggles Wilson Sr. (February 28, 1822 – January 21, 1903) was a prominent Presbyterian theologian and father of President Woodrow Wilson, Nashville Banner editor Joseph Ruggles Wilson Jr., and Anne E. Wilson Howe. In 1861, as pastor of First Presbyterian Church in Augusta, Georgia, he organized the General Assembly of the newly formed Presbyterian Church in the United States, known as the Southern Presbyterian Church, and served as its clerk (chief executive officer) for thirty-seven years.

Life and work
Wilson was born in Steubenville, Ohio, the son of Mary Anne (Adams) and James Wilson, who were Protestant immigrants from Strabane, County Tyrone, Northern Ireland. He graduated from Jefferson College in Canonsburg, Pennsylvania (now Washington & Jefferson College) in 1844.
He taught literature at Washington & Jefferson.

Wilson married Jessie Woodrow and was later employed as a professor at Hampden-Sydney College. He left the school just before the birth of his son, Thomas Woodrow Wilson, in Staunton, Virginia. There he became the pastor of Staunton's Presbyterian Church, which he held from 1855 to 1857. In late 1857 he moved his family to Augusta, Georgia, where he continued to practice as a Presbyterian pastor.

Joseph and Jessie Wilson had moved to the South in 1851 and came to fully identify with it, moving from Virginia deeper into the region as Wilson was called to be a minister in Georgia and South Carolina. Joseph Wilson owned slaves, defended slavery, and also set up a Sunday school for his slaves. Wilson and his wife identified with the Confederacy during the American Civil War; they cared for wounded soldiers at their church, and Wilson briefly served as a chaplain to the Confederate States Army.

In 1861 Wilson was one of the founders of the Southern Presbyterian Church in the United States (PCUS) after it split from the northern Presbyterians. He served as the first permanent clerk of the PCUS General Assembly, was Stated Clerk for more than three decades from 1865 to 1898, and was Moderator of the PCUS General Assembly in 1879. He became minister of the First Presbyterian Church in Augusta, Georgia, serving until 1870.

Wilson became a professor at Columbia Theological Seminary in Columbia, South Carolina, in 1870. He moved to the pastorate at the First Presbyterian Church, Wilmington, North Carolina in 1874. During his time in Wilmington, he presided over many events, including the payment of the local church's debts, the abolition of pew rents, and the inauguration of subscription and weekly contributions. In 1885 he became a professor of theology at Rhodes College which was then known as Southwestern Presbyterian University in Clarksville, Tennessee.

Children
Thomas Woodrow Wilson (December 28, 1856 – February 3, 1924), professor and President of Princeton University (1902-1910), Governor of New Jersey (1911-1913), President of the United States (1913-1921)
Joseph Ruggles Wilson Jr. (1867 – 1927), editor of the Nashville Banner
Annie Josephine Wilson Howe (1854 – 1916)

References

People from Steubenville, Ohio
Woodrow Wilson family
Hampden–Sydney College faculty
Washington & Jefferson College alumni
Washington & Jefferson College faculty
Princeton Theological Seminary alumni
19th-century Presbyterian ministers
Presbyterian Church in the United States ministers
1822 births
1903 deaths
Presbyterian Church in the United States members
Fathers of presidents of the United States
American slave owners
American people of Scotch-Irish descent
American proslavery activists
American white supremacists
19th-century American clergy